The Shops at Sunset Place is an outdoor shopping mall in South Miami, Florida at the intersection of Dixie Highway (US 1) and Red Road (West 57th Avenue). The mall opened in 1999 and is owned by Federal Realty, Grass River Property, and Comras Company.

The Shops at Sunset Place is serviced by the Miami Metrorail at the South Miami station. The station is located across the street from the shopping mall on the corner of Sunset Drive and US 1.

The Shops at Sunset Place currently houses the Miami-area's only GameTime location. There is a Forever 21 across from a spot for a restaurant. A Splitsville Luxury Lanes and Dinner Lounge bowling alley was added in 2008.

Prior to the building of Sunset Place, the property was the site of The Bakery Centre, which opened in 1986 on the site of the old Holsum Bread Bakery. The Bakery Centre was a retail and office complex that included a 7-screen AMC Theatres multiplex. It was demolished in 1996.

In October 2015, Simon Property Group sold the mall to Federal Realty, Grass River Property, and the Comras Company for $110 million.

See also
List of shopping malls in South Florida

References

External links
The Shops at Sunset Place Official Website

Shopping malls in Miami-Dade County, Florida
Shopping malls established in 1999
1999 establishments in Florida